Euphorbia triangularis, commonly known as river euphorbia, chandelier-tree or tree euphorbia, is a species of plant in the family Euphorbiaceae native to southern Africa.

References 

triangularis
triangularis